Neopets: The Darkest Faerie is an action-adventure game developed by Idol Minds and published by Sony Computer Entertainment for the PlayStation 2 in 2005.

Plot 
Neopets: The Darkest Faerie is set in "Neopia", the land of the Neopets universe, which is inhabited by anthropomorphic versions of various Neopets species. The adventure is based on a story written by Neopets founder Adam Powell.

Long ago, a dark faerie was imprisoned at the bottom of the Maraquan sea as punishment for attempting to take over the realm, her name having been erased from history and the faerie remembered only as 'the Darkest Faerie'. However, after a thousand years, the spell imprisoning the Darkest Faerie has become weak and breaks, and the faerie escapes, returning to the surface intent on taking over the realm of Neopia and exacting revenge upon the Faerie queen Fyora who imprisoned her.

The game begins with Tormund Ellis (nicknamed "Tor"), a young Lupe farm boy who has long dreamed of being a knight in the city of Meridell. After being accepted into the ranks and training under the discipline of the castle's master-at-arms, Torak, Tormund is knighted after saving the village of Cogham from The Ixi Raiders. But when answering a plea to defend the nearby forest glade of Illusen, the earth faerie, from an invading tribe of Werelupes, the mission fails, and Tormund returns to Meridell to discover both it and its inhabitants under a cloud of dark magic and the control of the Darkest Faerie. Though unaffected himself, he is driven out of the castle and city by the faerie's minions.

The neighboring kingdom of Brightvale notices the dark clouds, and sends a diplomatic envoy to the city of Faerieland, home to the Faerie queen Fyora, to investigate. A young Acara, Roberta, the niece of Brightvale King Hagan, is among the diplomats. The Darkest Faerie attacks Faerieland that night, capturing and binding the Faerie queen and covering the castle in a dark aura. Roberta is able to escape the castle but is pursued and falls to the countryside of Neopia below.

Roberta and Tormund meet each other and then proceed to warn the king of Brightvale about the Faerie. It is revealed that both were given amulets to protect against the Darkest Faerie's power, and upon research discover that the Darkest Faerie was once sealed away by the power of Fyora's magical rod, now lying deep underneath the city of Meridell. After freeing the neighboring regions from control of dark magic, they are able to infiltrate the castle of Meridell and find a way deep underground, recovering Fyora's ancient rod. With its power they are able to drive the darkness out of the city, and then return to Faerieland to stop the Darkest Faerie. It is a trap, however, as the Darkest Faerie seizes the rod and a fight between the two Faeries ensues. Fyora is able to teleport Tormund and Roberta to safety before being captured and imprisoned again.

When Tor and Roberta awaken, they find themselves in the lost Kingdom of Altador, which was thought to have been destroyed by the Darkest Faerie one thousand years ago. Through research, they learn that the Darkest Faerie was one of the Kingdom's founders who later betrayed them, and that her spell can be broken by awakening the other founders, also known as "The Protectors". Once they have awakened the Protectors and restored the Kingdom to Neopia, one of them, Jerdana, gives them the same orb that Fyora used to imprison the Darkest Faerie beneath the ocean, and opens a portal for them to return to Faerieland, where a final confrontation between our heroes, and the Darkest Faerie is held.

The final fight with the Darkest Faerie is timed, as the Darkest Faerie uses Fyora's Rod to cause Faerieland to start falling onto Meridell. If you do not defeat her within three minutes, Faerieland will crash into Meridell and you will be returned to the title screen. If you succeed, you imprison her once again with Jerdana's Orb, free Queen Fyora and retrieve the Rod. Fyora then uses the Rod to stop Faerieland's descent just before it impacts Meridell and returns it to the sky. Tormund and Roberta are hailed as heroes as the game ends, and the Darkest Faerie can be seen as a statue on a fountain in Faerieland, where Queen Fyora says, "She will be kept a close eye on."

Development 
A PlayStation version of the game was being developed by The Code Monkeys and was cancelled in favor of a PlayStation 2 version. According to the Neopets team, this was done because they "felt that it couldn't achieve everything we wanted it to on the PS1" and "so the graphics will be much better." It is believed that the protagonists were largely the same and a new antagonist to the series would have been present, who was named Master Nola, and spanned two discs, one for each protagonist.

Gameplay 
In this game, Tormund and Roberta are playable. Tor uses a sword to attack and Roberta uses magic attacks. Both of them has the power to use specials, or motes, which when used in a powerup attack unveil special effects ranging from poisoning the enemies to creating a beam of light. Magic power becomes weaker as their magic reserve is used. However, Purple Juppies, and other fruits/potions, replenish the player's magic gauge when they're eaten/used.

In Neopia, there are many motes that assist Tor and Roberta in their fight to bring light to the shadows. These motes can be equipped to Tor and Roberta's weapons, shields, and armor. The motes throughout Neopia include; Light, Sun, Fog, Wind, Fire, Lava, Nova, Supernova, Dark, Shadow, Leaf, Rock, Bubble, and Water.

Players can feed a petpet so that he can follow them. When fed, it will follow the character for a certain time depending on food type that it was fed and its inherent species. It gives a range of special effects: seeing the invisible/health restore/etc. After feeding the petpet the same kind of food for too long, it will not accept it.

Reception 

The game received a score of 61 on review aggregator website Metacritic, indicating "mixed or average" reviews.

See also 
 Neopets: Petpet Adventures: The Wand of Wishing

Notes

References

External links 
 Official website
 

2005 video games
Action-adventure games
Neopets
North America-exclusive video games
PlayStation 2 games
PlayStation 2-only games
Single-player video games
Sony Interactive Entertainment games
Video games scored by Jack Wall
Video games developed in the United States
Video games featuring female protagonists
Deck Nine games